Nazario may refer to
Ronaldo Nazario (born 1976), Brazilian former footballer
Nazario (given name)
Nazario (surname)
Nazário, a municipality in Brazil
Nazario Collection, a cache of carved stones at Guayanilla, Puerto Rico
San Nazario, Veneto, a town and comune in Italy
Santi Nazario e Celso, Urgnano, a church in Lombardy, Italy